The 2019 season was IFK Göteborg's 114th in existence, their 87th season in Allsvenskan and their 43rd consecutive season in the league. They competed in Allsvenskan and Svenska Cupen.

Players

Squad

Club

Other information

Competitions

Overall

Allsvenskan

League table

Results summary

Results by round

Matches
Kickoff times are in UTC+2 unless stated otherwise.

Svenska Cupen

2018–19
The tournament continued from the 2018 season.

Kickoff times are in UTC+1.

Group stage

2019–20
The tournament continued into the 2020 season.

Qualification stage

Non competitive

Pre-season
Kickoff times are in UTC+1 unless stated otherwise.

Mid-season

Notes

References

IFK Göteborg seasons
IFK Goteborg